Stoddard is a ghost town in Thayer County, Nebraska, United States.

History
Stoddard was a depot on the Chicago, Burlington and Quincy Railroad. A post office was established at Stoddard in 1886, and remained in operation until it was discontinued in 1934.

References

Geography of Thayer County, Nebraska